Sloan Thomas (born December 22, 1981 in Clarksville, Tennessee) is a former American football wide receiver from the National Football League. He went to Klein High School in Klein, Texas. He played in 46 games for the University of Texas, starting 20 contests. He caught 88 passes (ranked 10th on the school's career-record list) for 1,362 yards and 12 touchdowns (tied for seventh on the school record list). He was drafted in the 2004 NFL Draft by the Houston Texans. On August 31, 2006, Thomas was claimed off of waivers by the Jets. He was cut during the next training camp.

1981 births
Living people
People from Clarksville, Tennessee
People from Houston
American football wide receivers
Texas Longhorns football players
Tennessee Titans players
Klein High School alumni